Manus Province is the smallest province in Papua New Guinea in terms of both land area and population, with a land area of , but with more than  of water, and the total population is 60,485 (2011 census). The provincial town of Manus is Lorengau.

The province consists of only one district (Manus District; with identical boundaries to those of the province), 12 Local Level Governments (LLGs) and 127 Wards.

The province is made up of the Admiralty Islands (a group of 18 islands in the Bismarck Archipelago), as well as Wuvulu Island and nearby atolls in the west, which collectively are referred to as the Western Islands. The largest island in the group is Manus Island, where Lorengau and a former Australian immigration detention centre are located.

Flag

The Manus friarbird, known locally as the chauka, is represented on the Manus provincial flag. Designer of the Manus Province flag Luke Bulei explained his reasons for its design in 1977: chauka is only found in the Manus province; it heralds dawn and signals sunset; it often warns us of dangers; and lastly, it informs us of the success or otherwise of a forthcoming hunting trip. He added that NBC Radio Station had changed its name to Maus Bilong Chauka several years before. He explained that the colour brown on the flag represents the inland people and the blue represents the island people.  The other important symbol on the flag is the green snail, which is also unique to the Manus province.

District and LLGs
Manus Province has a single district, which contains one urban (Lorengau) and eleven rural Local Level Government (LLG) areas. Manus District has the highest number of LLGs of any other district in Papua New Guinea. For census purposes, the LLG areas are subdivided into wards and those into census units.

Provincial leaders

The province was governed by a decentralised provincial administration, headed by a Premier, from 1977 to 1995. Following reforms taking effect that year, notably the introduction of the Organic Law on Provincial Government and Local Level Government 1995, the national government reassumed some powers, and the role of Premier was replaced by a position of Governor, to be held by the winner of the province-wide seat in the National Parliament of Papua New Guinea.

Premiers (1977–1995)

Governors (1995–present)

Members of the National Parliament

The province and each district is represented by a Member of the National Parliament.  There is one provincial electorate and each district is an open electorate. Job Pomat as Manus District Open Member, elected into office in 2016, made history as the first politician from the province to be elected as the Speaker of the Parliament of Papua New Guinea in 2016.

References

Further reading

 WWII Battle for Manus Island

External links
 Manus Island

 
Admiralty Islands
Islands Region (Papua New Guinea)
Provinces of Papua New Guinea